Mont Blanc was a  74-gun third-rate ship of the line of the French Navy. In the course of her career, she was renamed no less than four times, reflecting the tides of politics with the French Revolution.

During the Wars of the First and Second Coalitions, Mont Blanc took part in the last actions of the Glorious First of June, in the Croisière du Grand Hiver, in the Battle of Hyères Islands and in Bruix' expedition of 1799; after peace was restored in the Treaty of Lunéville, she served during the Saint-Domingue expedition.

Mont Blanc took part of the vanguard of the French fleet the Battle of Trafalgar on 21 October 1805, and consequently saw little action as this division was cut off from the battle. The squadron was destroyed during the Battle of Cape Ortegal on 4 November 1805, where Mont Blanc was captured. She was recommissioned in the Royal Navy but never saw action again.

Career 
She was built at Rochefort as Pyrrhus in 1791. She was renamed Mont Blanc in 1793 before being renamed Trente-et-un Mai in 1794. Under that name she fought at the Glorious First of June in 1794 under Captain Ganteaume. She took part in the Croisière du Grand Hiver, where she rescued the crew of the sinking Scipion.

In 1795 she was renamed Républicain, taking part in the Battle of Hyères Islands, and Ganteaume's expedition of 1795, and then became Mont Blanc again in 1796. She took part in Bruix' expedition of 1799 under Captain Maistral.

In 1802 she took part in the Saint-Domingue expedition under Magon.

She was one of the ships of Rear-Admiral Lepelley at the Battle of Trafalgar on 21 October 1805. Nelson's attacks left these ships downwind of the main confrontation and Dumanoir did not immediately obey Villeneuve's orders to return to the battle. When the ships did turn back, most of them only exchanged a few shots before retiring.

Mont Blanc was taken and commissioned in the Royal Navy as HMS Mont Blanc. She was used as a gunpowder hulk from 1811, and was sold in 1819.

Notes and references

Notes

References

Bibliography 
 
 

Ships of the line of the French Navy
Téméraire-class ships of the line
Captured ships
Ships built in France
1791 ships